Naproxen/pseudoephedrine, sold under the brand name Aleve-D among others, is a fixed-dose combination medication used for the treatment of nasal congestion and other symptoms of the common cold. It contains naproxen, as the sodium salt, a nonsteroidal anti-inflammatory drug (NSAID); and pseudoephedrine, as the hydrochloride, a nasal decongestant.

References

External links 
 

Bayer brands
Combination drugs
Decongestants
Johnson & Johnson brands